The Colac & District Football Netball League (CDFNL) is a minor country football league based in the South West of Victoria in the city of Colac. The CDFNL has 10 clubs, all located in the Colac Otway Shire, with the exception of Lorne, which falls within the Surf Coast Shire. The competition incorporates the two sports of Australian rules football and netball.

History
The Colac & District Football League was formed in 1937, as a result of a merger of the Colac and District FA (known pre-1936 as the Colac Churches FA) and the Corangamite Farmers FA. It had A Grade and B Grade competitions.

In 1950 there was a mass exodus of clubs from the CDFL, the cause was that the Colac (Hampden league) team wanted to have the right to pick any player from the Colac DFL without needing a clearance. The result was Colac Imperials and Coragulac opted to leave and join the Polwarth FL and be away from Colac's reach. Beeac went to the Western Plains FL for two years before also joining the Polwarth FL, and Colac Rovers folded. With only Alvie and Warrion remaining in A Grade the surviving B Grade clubs combined into a single local competition along with Carlisle River from the Otway FA.

Over the years, a number of clubs moved between the CDFL and other local leagues, including the Otway Football Association, Polwarth Football League, and the Heytesbury Mt Noorat Football League, all of which are now defunct.

The Polwarth Football League folded after the 1970 season, with Lorne and Apollo Bay joining the CDFL and the other clubs moving to the Bellarine FL.

Otway Districts and Simpson joined the CDFL in 2003, after the Heytesbury Mt Noorat FL folded.

In early 2016, it was announced that Forrest would fold due to lack of players.

Clubs

Current clubs

Former clubs

General statistics

Premierships

1937	Swan Marsh	3	5	23	defeated	Elliminyt	2	3	15
1938	Warrion	        7	6	48	defeated	Nalangil	1	7	13
1939	Colac Rovers	7	12	54	defeated	Coragulac	3	7	25
1940	Coragulac	6	3	39	defeated	Pirron Yallock	5	6	36
1941	to 1944 no play due to war
1945	Colac Imperials	9	10	64	defeated	Alvie	7	6	48
1946	Coragulac	7	9	51	defeated	Beeac	5	11	41
1947	Colac Imperials	13	8	86	defeated	Coragulac	9	4	58
1948	Coragulac	8	9	57	defeated	Colac Rovers	7	9	51
1949	Colac Imperials	6	8	44	defeated	Alvie	3	9	27
1950	Alvie	8	5	53	defeated	Warrion	3	8	26
1951	South Colac	5	7	37	defeated	Warrion	3	11	29
1952	Warrion	11	13	79	defeated	Irrewillipe	7	13	55
1953	Irrewillipe	11	9	75	defeated	Carlisle River	7	16	58
1954	Alvie	16	13	109	defeated	South Colac	6	22	58
1955	Irrewillipe	7	12	54	defeated	Irrewarra	5	6	36
1956	Irrewarra	6	8	44	defeated	Colac Imperials	4	9	33
1957	Otway Rovers	12	10	82	defeated	Warrion	5	5	35
1958	Otway Rovers	11	7	73	defeated	Colac Imperials	9	8	62
1959	Alvie	10	18	78	defeated	Otway Rovers	10	11	71
1960	South Purrumbete	9	12	66	defeated	Otway Rovers	6	10	46
1961	Otway Rovers	14	13	97	defeated	Alvie	10	19	79
1962	Alvie	7	9	51	defeated	Colac Imperials	4	5	29
1963	Colac Imperials	9	13	67	defeated	Otway Rovers	8	18	66
1964	Colac Imperials	6	4	40	defeated	Alvie	4	8	32
1965	Alvie	13	16	94	defeated	Otway Rovers	10	11	71
1966	Alvie	17	7	109	defeated	Otway Rovers	10	11	71
1967	Alvie	11	6	72	defeated	Otway Rovers	10	10	70
1968	Otway Rovers	10	13	73	defeated	Colac Imperials	10	8	68
1969	Alvie	11	17	83	defeated	Irrewillipe	4	5	29
1970	Alvie	10	9	69	defeated	South Colac	8	6	54
1971	Irrewillipe	11	7	73	defeated	Alvie	9	10	64
1972	Irrewarra	13	19	97	defeated	Apollo Bay	9	7	61
1973	South Purrumbete	6	7	43	Defeated	Lorne	6	5	41
1974	Lorne	7	6	48	defeated	Alvie	6	8	44
1975	Alvie	9	12	66	defeated	Lorne	6	8	44
1976	Lorne	10	18	78	defeated	Colac Imperials	6	10	46
1977	Alvie	11	6	72	defeated	Colac Imperials	10	10	70
1978	South Colac	16	9	105	defeated	Colac Imperials	15	12	102
1979	Colac Imperials	14	18	102	defeated	Lorne	14	11	95
1980	Lorne	13	13	91	defeated	Irrewillipe	8	9	57
1981	Lorne	15	12	102	defeated	South Colac	12	10	82
1982	Lorne	18	10	118	defeated	South Colac	11	10	76
1983	Lorne	17	9	111	defeated	South Colac	10	2	62
1984	Apollo Bay	13	12	90	defeated	Lorne	9	8	62
1985	Birregurra	22	8	140	defeated	Alvie	17	8	110
1986	Colac Imperials	15	7	97	defeated	Winchelsea	6	12	48
1987	Winchelsea	19	21	135	defeated	Colac Imperials	10	10	70
1988	South Colac	15	6	96	defeated	Winchelsea	10	7	67
1989	Colac Imperials	17	11	113	defeated	South Colac	9	13	67
1990	Birregurra	14	16	100	defeated	South Colac	13	11	89
1991	Colac Imperials	13	16	94	defeated	Birregurra	12	13	85
1992	Irrewillipe	11	9	75	defeated	Colac Imperials	8	14	62
1993	Apollo Bay	12	11	83	defeated	Winchelsea	9	15	69
1994	Birregurra	15	5	95	defeated	Winchelsea	13	5	83
1996	Apollo Bay	11	13	79	defeated	Lorne	9	8	62
1997	South Colac	16	14	110	defeated	Lorne	10	14	74
1998	Lorne	        11	9	75	defeated	Alvie	6	12	48
1999	Apollo Bay	19	17	131	defeated	Alvie	   12	8	80
2000	Alvie	        13	16	94	defeated	Lorne	        10	17	77
2001	Lorne	        18	18	126	defeated	South Colac	6	9	45
2002	South Colac	14	8	92	defeated	Lorne           12	11	83
2003	Apollo Bay	5	13	43	defeated	Lorne    	4	8	32
2004	Apollo Bay	23	17	155	defeated	Lorne     	12	11	83
2005	Forrest  	3	5	23	defeated	Alvie	        2	4	16
2006	Lorne	        21	9	135	defeated	Irrewarra-Beeac	10	13	73
2007	Lorne	        13	12	90	defeated	Irrewarra-Beeac	9	8	62
2008	Irrewarra-Beeac	14	14	98	defeated	Lorne	        5	7	37
2009	Irrewarra-Beeac	17	18	120	defeated	Birregurra	10	8	68
2010	Irrewarra-Beeac	11	10	76	defeated	Birregurra	11	8	74
2011	Birregurra	6	10	46	defeated	South Colac	6	7	43
2012   Forrest         7        5      47      defeated        Lorne           5       12      42
2013   Lorne           15     11       101     defeated        Colac Imperials 11      6       72
2014   Simpson         21     13       139     defeated        Birregurra      5       6       36
2015   Simpson         12     10       82      defeated        Irrewarra-Beeac 8       11      59
2016   Birregurra      11     10       76      defeated        South Colac     7       12      54
2017   Birregurra      15     4    94  defeated Lorne  5 7 37
2018 Lorne 8 10 58 defeated Birregurra 5 7 37
2019 Lorne 10 18 78 defeated South Colac 2 7 19
2020 no play due to COVID pandemic
2021 no play due to COVID pandemic
2022 South Colac 9.5 59 defeated Irrewarra Beeac 6.2 38

Grand Final Draws
1963 Colac Imperials 3 8 26 Drew with Otway Rovers 3 8 26

Leading Goal Kickers

2022 Junior Season

References

External links 

Colac & District F/L Netball Association
League's Official Broadcaster

Australian rules football competitions in Victoria (Australia)
Colac, Victoria
Netball leagues in Victoria (Australia)